Robert–Rajasekar was an Indian filmmaking duo consisting of Robert Asirvatham and S. Rajasekar. They were active in film direction and cinematography in Tamil cinema of the 1980s. The duo are regarded to have ushered a "new wave" in Tamil cinema.

Career 
In the 1970s, Robert Asirvatham and S. Rajasekar graduated as cameramen from the Madras Film Institute. They debuted as cinematographers with Kudisai (1979), a low budget film directed by Jayabharathi, also from the institute. Robert–Rajasekar's next film was to be Naalai Ulagam Namadhe, which was never completed. They were later hired to work in Oru Thalai Ragam (1980), which emerged a major success and a breakthrough in their career. Robert–Rajasekar made their directorial debut with Palaivana Solai (1981), where they also wrote the screenplay (based on Rajasekar's story) and continued as cinematographers. The film was a success, and they received more directorial offers. Their next directorial venture Kalyana Kalam (1982), however, became a box-office bomb. After two years of no work, they were offered to direct Chinna Poove Mella Pesu (1987) which emerged a success, and revitalised their career. In 2008, Robert–Rajasekar made their television debut by directing some episodes of Naanal.

Deaths 
Robert died on 30 November 2018, and Rajasekar on 8 September 2019.

Filmography

References

External links 
 

Indian filmmaking duos
Indian male screenwriters
Indian screenwriting duos
Tamil film directors